Juan Parker (11 February 1918 – 6 June 2001) was an Argentine rower. He competed in the men's coxed pair event at the 1948 Summer Olympics.

References

1918 births
2001 deaths
Argentine male rowers
Olympic rowers of Argentina
Rowers at the 1948 Summer Olympics
Rowers from Buenos Aires